Robert L. "Bob" Pavlak, Sr. (July 18, 1924 – October 9, 1994) was an American police officer and politician.

Early life

Born in St. Paul, Minnesota in 1924, Pavlak grew up in Catholic orphanages in Milaca, Minnesota. His father, Leo Pavlak, was a South St. Paul police officer who was shot and killed during a payroll robbery by Arthur Barker of the Ma Barker Gang on August 30, 1933. Bob Pavlak's mother died of cancer the following year, leaving him orphaned at age 10.

Bob Pavlak served in the United States Marine Corps during World War II. After the war, he joined the St. Paul Police Department. He worked as a downtown traffic officer for many years.

He married Edel Ruth in 1951. They had six children.

Political career

Pavlak was elected to the Minnesota House of Representatives in 1966. His district included precincts in St. Paul and West St. Paul. A Republican, Pavlak served in the legislature until 1974, having won reelection in 1968, 1970, and 1972. In 1974, Pavlak lost his seat when he was defeated by Arnold Kempe, the candidate of the Democratic Farmer Labor Party.

The 1978 Election Controversy

Pavlak returned to politics in 1978. In an extremely close race, he defeated Kempe by a margin of 321 votes out of more than 8,500 votes cast. However, in 1979, the Minnesota House of Representatives removed Pavlak from office and ordered a special election on grounds that Pavlak's campaign had violated Minnesota's Fair Campaign Practices Act.

The controversy arose over a factually erroneous editorial in the Saint Paul Dispatch newspaper. On November 4, 1978—three days before the election—a Dispatch editorial mistakenly claimed that Kempe had missed 325 of 329 roll call votes in the legislature. In fact, he had only missed 329 out of 1,798 roll call votes.

The Dispatch based its editorial on documents provided to it by Pavlak during an interview with Dispatch editor William Sumner. Pavlak's documents accurately identified Kempe's missed roll call votes. However, the Dispatch'''s editorial board misinterpreted the documents. In its November 4 editorial, the Dispatch asserted that its editors "have seen nothing to dispute his [Pavlak's] research report that shows the incumbent voted four times in 1967-68 this out of more than 300 opportunities." After the Dispatch published the erroneous editorial, Pavlak's campaign alerted the editors to the fact that Kempe's missed roll call votes occurred in 1977–78, not 1967–68.

But Pavlak's campaign did not alert the editors to the newspaper's gross misstatement of Kempe's voting record. Moreover, Pavlak's campaign subsequently reprinted at least 1,800 copies of the flawed editorial and circulated them in the district just before election day.

On November 7, 1978, Pavlak defeated Kempe by 4,454 votes to 4,133. Pavlak took his seat in the Minnesota House of Representatives on January 3, 1979.

The election contest, however, was far from over. Voters in the district filed a lawsuit alleging that Pavlak's campaign had violated state election law by reprinting and circulating the deeply flawed Dispatch'' editorial. In addition, the Minnesota legislature initiated an investigation into the Pavlak-Kempe election controversy.

In a May 11, 1979 ruling, the Minnesota Supreme Court held that Pavlak's campaign violated state election law:

"[I]t is our conclusion that Mr. Pavlak violated Minn.St. 210A.04 and that this violation was 'deliberate, serious and material' within the meaning of Minn.St. 209.02. It was deliberate in the sense that the distribution of the statement as worded was intentional and was intended to affect the voting at the election. It was serious because the distribution of 1,800-1,900 reprints in a single legislative district is a far from trivial amount. It was material because voting is the essence of a representative's position, and attacking voting performance is germane to one's conduct in that position."

However, the court declined to overturn the election results. Article 4, Section 6 of the Minnesota Constitution provides that "Each house shall be the judge of the election returns and eligibility of its own members." The Minnesota Supreme Court interpreted Section 6 as ousting the courts of jurisdiction over the Pavlak case. Section 6, the court held, was "an absolute grant of constitutional power [to the legislature] which may not be delegated to or shared with the courts." Accordingly, the justices concluded that "we have no jurisdiction to issue a final and binding decision in this matter, and our opinion by statute will be and by the Minnesota Constitution must only be advisory to the House of Representatives."

The Minnesota House of Representatives ultimately resolved the issue in a party-line vote. The 1978 election saw the House of Representatives evenly divided between the DFL and the Independent-Republicans, 67 seats to 67. But House rules barred members from voting on their own election contests. Consequently, with Pavlak unable to participate in the vote, the House voted 67 to 66 to vacate Pavlak's seat and order a new election.

Pavlak mounted a new campaign for his seat but he lost the June 19, 1979 special election to Frank J. Rodriguez Sr., the first Hispanic elected to the Minnesota House of Representatives.

U.S. Marshal

Pavlak retired from the St. Paul Police Department with the rank of lieutenant in 1981. President Ronald Reagan appointed him the United States Marshal for the District of Minnesota in 1981. Pavlak retired as United States Marshal in 1990.

Death

Pavlak died of esophageal cancer at his home in West St. Paul, Minnesota on October 9, 1994 at age 70. His funeral service was held at his home parish, St. Matthews Catholic Church, in St. Paul. He was buried at Fort Snelling National Cemetery. Colleagues described him as "a consummate gentleman."

Notes

1924 births
1994 deaths
Politicians from Saint Paul, Minnesota
Military personnel from Minnesota
American police officers
United States Marshals
Republican Party members of the Minnesota House of Representatives
People from West St. Paul, Minnesota
20th-century American politicians
United States Marine Corps personnel of World War II
Deaths from esophageal cancer
Deaths from cancer in Minnesota